The Australian Capital Territory (Self-Government) Act 1988 is an Act of the Parliament of Australia enacted on 6 December 1988, that establishes "a body politic under the Crown by the name of the Australian Capital Territory" and is the constitutional foundation of the Territory's government.

Overview of provisions 
The Act creates a government for the Australian Capital Territory that is separate from the Commonwealth government.

Part I of the Act contains a number of preliminary provisions.

Part II, which consists of a single section, establishes "a body politic under the Crown by the name of the Australian Capital Territory"

Part III establishes the Legislative Assembly as a popularly elected unicameral parliament consisting of at least 17 members, presided over by a Presiding Officer (called the Speaker).

Part IV sets out the powers of the Legislative Assembly to make laws for the "peace, order, and good government" of the Territory with some limited exceptions. It also provides for the conversion of federal laws, such as ordinances made under the old Administration Act, for the Territory into "enactments" which the Legislative Assembly can alter.

Part V establishes and regulates the Territory Executive, which consists of a Chief Minister elected by the Assembly and at least five Ministers.

Part VA, inserted by the ACT Supreme Court Transfer Act 1992, empowers and regulates the Territory's courts, providing the jurisdiction of the Supreme Court, the means of appointment and removal of judges, and the relationship of the Territory courts with the Federal Court.

Part VII regulates the raising and spending of public monies and the financial relationship between the Territory and the Commonwealth.

Part VIII regulates elections to the Assembly.

History 
The territory presently called the Australian Capital Territory was transferred to the Commonwealth by the state of New South Wales as the Federal Capital Territory on  1911, to be the seat of the federal government. The planning and construction of Canberra followed, with the Parliament of Australia moving there in 1927. On its creation, the Territory's few residents lost any representation they had in the federal parliament and had no means of electing a government to make laws.

In 1930, the ACT Advisory Council replaced the Federal Capital Commission, which had existed since 1925. The Council and the Minister for Territories administered the ACT. In 1934, the ACT Supreme Court was created. The Territory officially became the Australian Capital Territory in 1938.

In 1974, the Advisory Council became a fully elected Legislative Assembly, but with only an advisory role to the Department of the Capital Territory. In 1979 the re-named House of Assembly had 18 elected members. On 27 November 1978, the Australian Capital Territory voted at a referendum on whether the ACT should be granted self-government. Voters were given the choice of becoming a self-governing territory, a local government or continuing with the Legislative Assembly being an advisory body to the Department of the Capital Territory. 63.75% voted to continue with the then current arrangement.

Despite the outcome of the referendum, the ACT Assembly was dissolved in 1986, and the Parliament of Australia passed the Australian Capital Territory (Self-Government) Act in 1988 and the ACT became a self-governing territory in 1989. The first elections in the ACT were held on 4 March 1989; and the Australian Capital Territory Legislative Assembly first sat on 11 May that year.

See also
 Australian Capital Territory Legislative Assembly
 ACT Government

References

 Parliament@Work - At a Glance Australian Capital Territory
 Full text of the Australian Capital Territory (Self-Government) Act 1988 on the Federal Register of Legislation
 National Archives of Australia - Australian Capital Territory (Self-Government) Act 1988
 ACT Legislation register - sources of law

Acts of the Parliament of Australia
History of the Australian Capital Territory
1988 in Australian law